Gonzalo Emanuel Rodríguez (born 18 September 1990) is an Argentine professional footballer who plays as a forward for Ferro Carril Oeste.

Career
Rodríguez began his career with local club Deportivo Aguilares in 2009, though he failed to feature for the Torneo Argentino C side. Primera B Nacional's San Martín completed the signing of Rodríguez in 2010. He subsequently made five appearances in the 2009–10 Primera B Nacional, including his professional debut against Defensa y Justicia on 6 February 2010. Three seasons later, in the 2012–13 Torneo Argentino A following relegation, he scored the first goals of his senior career in March 2013 during a 2–2 draw with Guaraní Antonio Franco. Months later, fellow third tier outfit San Jorge signed Rodríguez on 7 July.

He achieved twenty-three appearances and scored four goals, including two in separate matches versus ex-club San Martín, in all competitions in the 2013–14 Torneo Argentino A season for San Jorge. At the conclusion of that campaign, San Martín resigned Rodríguez. In the subsequent four years with the team, Rodríguez netted twenty-one times in one hundred and ten league fixtures as they rose from Torneo Federal A to the Argentine Primera División. His first appearance in the top-flight arrived in August 2018 against Unión Santa Fe.

Career statistics
.

Honours
San Martín
Torneo Federal A: 2016

References

External links

1990 births
Living people
Sportspeople from Tucumán Province
Argentine footballers
Association football forwards
Primera Nacional players
Torneo Argentino A players
Torneo Federal A players
Argentine Primera División players
San Martín de Tucumán footballers
San Jorge de Tucumán footballers
Ferro Carril Oeste footballers